Pool D of the 2011 Rugby World Cup began on 10 September 2011 and was completed on 2 October. The pool was composed of the current Rugby World Cup holders South Africa, as well as Wales, Samoa, Fiji and Namibia.

Overall

All times are local New Zealand time (UTC+12 until 24 September, UTC+13 from 25 September)

Fiji v Namibia

South Africa v Wales

Samoa v Namibia

South Africa v Fiji

Wales v Samoa

South Africa v Namibia

Fiji v Samoa

Wales v Namibia

South Africa v Samoa

Wales v Fiji

References

External links
Pool D at rugbyworldcup.com

Pool D
2010–11 in Welsh rugby union
2011 in South African rugby union
2011 in Samoan rugby union
2011 in Tongan rugby union
2011 in Namibian sport